Robert James Lukachyk (born July 24, 1968 in Jersey City, New Jersey) is a former American professional baseball player. Lukachyk played briefly for the Montreal Expos of the Major League Baseball (MLB) during their 1996 season.

Career
Lukachyk was selected by the Chicago White Sox in the 10th round of the 1987 MLB Draft out of Brookdale Community College in New Jersey. After that, he signed as a free agent with the Baltimore Orioles (1993) and Detroit Tigers (1994) before joining the Expos organization.

Originally a corner infielder and outfielder in the minors, Lukachyk made two appearances as a pinch-hitter for Montreal and went hitless in two at bats.

In between, Lukachyk played winter ball with the Pastora de Occidente club of the Venezuelan League in the 1996–97 season.

Lukachyk eventually moved on to play for the Somerset Patriots of the independent Atlantic League of Professional Baseball.  After his playing days were over, he moved on to work in their front office.

Rob Lukachyk now is a baseball instructor at Frozen Ropes in Union, NJ.

In a 12-season minor league career, he posted a .267 batting average with 104 home runs and 586 runs batted in in 1,185 games.

Sources
, or Retrosheet
Pura Pelota (Venezuelan Winter League)

1968 births
Living people
American expatriate baseball players in Canada
Baseball players from Jersey City, New Jersey
Bowie Baysox players
Brookdale Community College alumni
Brookdale Jersey Blues baseball players
El Paso Diablos players
Gulf Coast White Sox players
Harrisburg Senators players
Major League Baseball outfielders
Minor league baseball executives
Montreal Expos players
New Orleans Zephyrs players
Ottawa Lynx players
Pastora de Occidente players
Sarasota White Sox players
Somerset Patriots players
South Bend White Sox players
Sportspeople from Jersey City, New Jersey
Stockton Ports players
Toledo Mud Hens players
Utica Blue Sox players
American expatriate baseball players in Venezuela